Songs of Pain is the first album by folk singer-songwriter Daniel Johnston, recorded on a simple tape recorder and released on Compact Cassette. Johnston recorded these songs in the basement of his parents' house in West Virginia. It was recorded in 1980 and 1981, and handed out to friends by Johnston. It was rereleased on cassette by Stress Records in 1988, and on Compact Disc in 2003 by the label Dual Tone, together with More Songs of Pain as Early Recordings Volume 1.

Background 
Johnston began writing songs in 1979 to impress his friends Laurie Allen and Dave Thornberry. Johnston had a crush on Allen, and equated her with true love and all that was good with the world. Many of the songs written were self deprecating love songs to impress Allen. Eventually, in 1980, Johnston began recording the songs and compiling them into albums to share with his peers. The albums were recorded on a $59 Sanyo cassette recorder with Radio Shack tape stock. Johnston performed most of the instrumentation, and overdubbed the vocals himself. 

During the early recording of the album, in 1980, Johnston discovered that Allen was engaged to an undertaker, and was heartbroken when she moved to Florida with him, fuelling much of the album's depressive moods.

'Songs of Pain' was recorded between 1980 and 1981 during Daniel Johnston's Freshman, Sophomore and Junior years studying at Kent State University in East Liverpool, Ohio. During this period, Johnston lived in his parents' basement in West Virginia, where he would make recordings to share with friends and fellow students. According to Douglas Wolk, writing for Pitchfork, the album was compiled for musician/painter Katy McCarty, who met Johnston circa 1985. Although Billboard mentions that Johnston began distributing Songs of Pain' when he moved to Houston, Texas in 1983. The album would be officially released in 1988 by Stress Records.
 Sound 
All songs feature Johnston on vocals and piano, except for "Premarital Sex", where he plays the organ. The opening track, "Grievances", introduces themes that reoccur throughout Johnston's career. He sings about his unrequited love for "the librarian", which refers to a girl named Laurie Allen who has functioned as a muse in many of Johnston's songs; this has been described as the quintessential Daniel Johnston song, including by Johnston himself. The lyrical and the musical themes of the song have been alluded to in later works, some examples include 'Museum of Love which features an identical chord progression in its verses, as well as 'Love Defined', (From both The Lost Recordings and Yip/Jump Music) which features part of the same progression during the line 'Love does not insist on its own way'. The word "grievances" has also been reused in the song title "Don't Let the Sun Go Down on Your Grievances".

Other themes on the album are premarital sex ("Joy Without Pleasure" and "Premarital Sex"), Christianity ("A Little Story") and cannabis ("Pot Head").

Between some of the songs are recorded confrontations between Johnston and his mother. Speaking on "The Goat Show" (a track featured on 'The Lost Recordings Volume 2'), Johnston implies this was an "act" he and his mother had been working on "for about 20 years". Johnston was born in 1961, and hence was about 20 when he recorded the album.

David Raposa for Pitchfork noted an influence from The Kinks' 'Lola' on the track 'Wicked Will', and Billboard Magazine compared 'Urge' to material by Plastic Ono Band, as well as 'Joy Without Pleasure' to the 'prim' song-writing of Paul McCartney.

Legacy 
In a 2003 review of the 'Songs of Pain' CD compilation (Which collects both this album and its 1983 sequel 'More Songs of Pain), David Raposa for Pitchfork discussed the album's tracks positively, describing the material as 'chilling,' 'jaunty' and 'happy-go-lucky.' 

In Pitchfork's 2010 review of 'The Story of an Artist' (A 6 disc collection of Johnston's early material), Douglas Wolk described 'Never Relaxed' as 'The funniest thing that Johnston ever recorded,' and 'Living Life' as 'A bloodied but unbowed power-pop tune.' Wolk also compared the album to 'More Songs of Pain,' which he called 'A more accomplished if less bracing take on a lot of the same themes.' On Billboard's '12 essential Daniel Johnston Tracks' article, both 'Urge' and 'Joy Without Pleasure' were included.  Willoughby Thom, writing for The Observer's retrospective on Daniel Johnston, describes Songs of Pain favorably, calling it 'Emotional and intensely beautiful,' praising its sincerity, truth, and simplistic lyrics.

In July 2021, the RO2 Gallery in Dallas, Texas, hosted an exhibition of Johnston's art named after the album, 'Story of an Artist & Songs of Pain'.

Influence 
In Hi How Are You, a book written on Johnston's career, Songs of Pain was listed as one of Kathy McCarty's most favored albums by the artist and she included five songs from the album on her 1994 tribute to Johnston, Dead Dog's Eyeball. In 1995, her cover of "Living Life" was featured in the romantic drama Film, Before Sunrise.

Track listing

Release history

References

External links 
 Daniel Johnston - Songs of Pain from the Daniel Johnston fansite RejectedUnknown.com

Daniel Johnston albums
1981 debut albums
Albums recorded in a home studio
Self-released albums